Ro-100 was an Imperial Japanese Navy  submarine. Completed and commissioned in September 1942, she served in World War II, operating in the Solomon Islands, Rabaul, and New Guinea areas. She sank in November 1943 when she struck a mine during her seventh war patrol.

Design and description
The Ro-100 class was a medium-sized, coastal submarine derived from the preceding Kaichū type. They displaced  surfaced and  submerged.

For surface running, the boats were powered by two  diesel engines, each driving one propeller shaft. When submerged each propeller was driven by a  electric motor. They could reach  on the surface and  underwater.

The boats were armed with four internal bow  torpedo tubes and carried a total of eight torpedoes. They were also armed with two single mounts for  Type 96 anti-aircraft guns or a single  L/40 AA gun.

Construction and commissioning

Ro-100 was laid down as Submarine No. 210 on 30 June 1941 by the Kure Naval Arsenal at Kure, Japan. She had been renamed Ro-100 by the time she was launched on 6 December 1941. She was completed and commissioned on 23 September 1942.

Service history

September 1942–February 1943
Upon commissioning, Ro-100 was attached to the Yokosuka Naval District and assigned to the Kure Submarine Squadron for workups. She was reassigned to Submarine Squadron 7 in the 8th Fleet on 15 December 1942. On 20 December 1942, she departed Yokosuka bound for Truk, which she reached on 28 December 1942.

Ro-100 departed Truk bound for Rabaul on New Britain on 6 January 1943, but suffered a diesel engine breakdown that forced her to return to Truk on 7 January 1943 for repairs. With her engine repaired, she again set out for Rabaul on 3 February 1943. While she was in the Bismarck Sea northwest of Rabaul on 6 February 1943, an Imperial Japanese Navy Air Service Aichi E13A1 (Allied reporting name "Jake") floatplane mistakenly bombed her, but she suffered only minor damage. She arrived at Rabaul on 7 February 1943.

First war patrol

On 8 February 1943, Ro-100 departed Rabaul to begin her first war patrol, assigned a patrol area in the Coral Sea south of Port Moresby, New Guinea. During the approach, her commanding officer neglected to conduct a periscope sweep to watch for other Allied ships, and he did not notice an approaching Allied destroyer until it was almost on top of Ro-100. The exploding depth charges caused several leaks in Ro-100s main engine room and conning tower, knocked out both of her periscopes, and caused her to take on a steep up-angle. To assist in getting Ro-100 back on an even keel so that her crew could regain control of her before she sank to collapse depth, her commanding officer ordered every available crewman to the forward torpedo room to weigh down her bow. Ro-100 survived, but was forced to abandon her patrol and return to Rabaul for repairs. After she arrived at Rabaul on 20 February 1943, several of her officers were replaced.

Operation I-Go

She returned to Rabaul on 12 April 1943.

Second and third war patrols

Ro-100 got underway from Rabaul on 22 April 1943 for her second war patrol, again bound for a patrol area southeast of Guadalcanal. The patrol was uneventful, and she returned to Rabaul on 14 May 1943. She put to sea on 27 May for her third war patrol, again southeast of Guadalcanal, but it also passed quietly, and she returned to Rabaul on 20 June 1943.

Fourth war patrol

On 30 June 1943, the New Georgia campaign began with the U.S. landings on New Georgia, Rendova, and other islands in the central Solomon Islands. Ro-100 departed Rabaul on 2 July 1943 for her fourth war patrol, assigned a patrol area south of Rendova. While in the Blanche Channel during darkness in early July 1943 conducting a reconnaissance of the American airfield on New Georgia, Ro-100 struck a reef, suffering damage to a fuel tank and two of her bow torpedo tubes. After reporting her damage, she received orders to pick up stranded Imperial Japanese Navy pilots of the 201st and 204th Naval Air Group at Simbo in the western Solomon Islands and then proceed to Rabaul for repairs. After picking up the pilots, she disembarked them at Buin on Bougainville, then arrived at Rabaul on 12 July 1943.

August 1943

On 7 August 1943, Ro-100 left Rabaul bound for the waters off New Guinea. Her crew soon noticed a leak from her recently repaired fuel tank, and she turned back. She was on the surface off Buka Island on 8 August 1943 when an unidentified submarine attacked her; she sighted the wakes of four torpedoes, but all of them missed. While she was on the surface off Cape St. George on New Ireland that night, an Allied patrol plane surprised her, dropping flares, missing her with two bombs, and strafing her. She crash-dived, escaped, and arrived at Rabaul on 11 August 1943.

Fifth and sixth war patrols

Ro-100 got underway from Rabaul in mid-August 1943 for her fifth war patrol. While at sea, she was reassigned to Submarine Division 51 on 20 August 1943, but otherwise the patrol was uneventful, and she returned to Rabaul in early September 1943. She put to sea on 7 September 1943 for her sixth war patrol, assigned a patrol area north of New Guinea. It also passed quietly, and she returned to Rabaul on 18 September 1943. She later proceeded to Truk, where she was drydocked on 30 September 1943.

Seventh war patrol

On 1 November 1943, the Bougainville campaign began with the U..S. landings at Cape Torokina on Bougainville. Tasked to run supplies to Japanese forces fighting on Bougainville and then patrol off Bougainville, Ro-100 departed Truk on 10 November and reached Rabaul on 19 November 1943. After loading a cargo of rubber containers packed with food, she departed Rabaul at 05:00 on 23 November 1943 on an emergency supply run to Buin on Bougainville.

Loss
The explosion blew her commanding officer and lookouts overboard, and she began to sink rapidly. Her engineering officer ordered all hands still on board to abandon ship. Sharks attacked her survivors as they tried to swim to Buin, and ultimately only 12 men out of her crew of 50 survived.

The Japanese struck Ro-100 from the Navy list on 5 February 1944.

Notes

References
 

Ships built by Kure Naval Arsenal
1941 ships
World War II submarines of Japan
Japanese submarines lost during World War II
Ro-100-class submarines
Ships sunk by mines
World War II shipwrecks in the Pacific Ocean
Maritime incidents in February 1943
Maritime incidents in July 1943
Maritime incidents in November 1943
Friendly fire incidents of World War II